Ramul may refer to:
Konstantin Ramul, Estonian psychologist
Ramul, Iran, a village